The Septennial Act 1715 (1 Geo 1 St 2 c 38), sometimes called the Septennial Act 1716, was an Act of the Parliament of Great Britain. It was passed in May 1716. It increased the maximum length of a parliament (and hence the maximum period between general elections) from three years to seven. This seven-year ceiling remained in law from 1716 until 1911. The previous limit of three years had been set by the Triennial Act 1694, enacted by the Parliament of England.

The Act's ostensible aim was to reduce the expense caused by frequent elections. It did not require parliament to last for a full term, but merely set a maximum length on its life. Most parliaments in the remainder of the eighteenth century did indeed last for six or seven years, with only two lasting for a shorter time. In the nineteenth century, the average length of a term of the Parliament of the United Kingdom was four years. One of the demands of the mid-nineteenth century Chartists—the only one that had not been achieved by the twentieth century—was for annually elected parliaments.

The Septennial Act 1715 was amended on 18 August 1911 by section 7 of the Parliament Act 1911 to reduce the maximum term of parliament to five years.

The Fixed-term Parliaments Act 2011 repealed the Septennial Act 1715 in its entirety.

Provisions

The text of the Act is very short. As originally in force, it stated:

The Act overturned certain provisions of the Triennial Act 1694.

Aim and effects
The ostensible aim of the Septennial Act 1715 was, by reducing the frequency of elections, to reduce the cost during a given period of holding them. However, it may have had the effect of keeping the Whig party, which had won the 1715 general election, in power for a longer time. The Whigs won the following general election in 1722.

Constitutionality
James Madison used the Septennial Act 1715 as an illustrative example of the difference between the traditional British system and the revolutionary new American constitution. In Federalist No. 53 Madison drew a distinction between "a Constitution established by the people and unalterable by the government, and a law established by the government and alterable by the government." The Act was also criticized by Thomas Paine and Henry St John, 1st Viscount Bolingbroke. In Dissertation upon Parties, Bolingbroke wrote that the "constitution is the rule by which our princes ought to govern at all times".

Prolongation of Parliament during the First World War and Second World War
During the First World War, a series of Acts was passed to prolong the life of the parliament elected in December 1910 until the end of the war in 1918. A series of annual Acts was also passed during the Second World War to prolong the parliament elected at the 1935 general election until the war in Europe had ended in mid-1945.

See also

 List of Acts of the Parliament of Great Britain, 1707–19
 List of parliaments of Great Britain

References
 'Book 1, Ch. 19: George I', A New History of London: Including Westminster and Southwark (1773), pp. 306–25. URL: http://www.british-history.ac.uk/report.asp?compid=46736. Date accessed: 20 November 2006.

External links

 

Election law in the United Kingdom
Election legislation
Great Britain Acts of Parliament 1716
Repealed Great Britain Acts of Parliament
Acts of the Parliament of the United Kingdom concerning the House of Commons